Colorado's 7th Senate district is one of 35 districts in the Colorado Senate. It has been represented by Republican Janice Rich since 2023. Prior to redistricting the district was represented by  Republicans Ray Scott and Steve King.

Geography
District 7 is exactly coterminous with Mesa County, covering Grand Junction and the nearby communities of Fruita, Palisade, Clifton, Fruitvale, Loma, Orchard Mesa, and Redlands.

The district is located entirely within Colorado's 3rd congressional district, and overlaps with the 54th and 55th districts of the Colorado House of Representatives. It borders the state of Utah.

Recent election results

2022
Colorado state senators are elected to staggered four-year terms; under normal circumstances, the 7th district holds elections in midterm years. The 2022 election will be the first held under the state's new district lines.

Historical election results

2018

2014

Federal and statewide results in District 7

References 

7
Mesa County, Colorado